XEB-AM (branded as La B Grande) is a radio station on AM frequency 1220 kHz, serving Mexico City and surrounding areas in Mexico.  It airs a Spanish language classic contemporary format with music from the 1940s to the 1970s.  It has been owned by the Instituto Mexicano de la Radio (IMER), a Mexican government public broadcaster, since IMER's founding in 1983.

History

Launch
On June 16, 1923, the first test transmissions were launched of a radio station then known as CYB, as part of the First International Radio Fair. It was launched by a cigarette company, the Compañía Cigarrera del Buen Tono, S.A., as a promotional activity; at the same time, it launched a cigarette brand "Radio". Its first complete transmission occurred on September 14, 1923, live commentary of the fight between Jack Dempsey and Luis Ángel Firpo from New York. José Velasco captured the New York station's signal at Pachuca and relayed the information to Enrique W. Curtiss, who broadcast it over CYB. The next day, the station held its inaugural concert, which included a message from Spanish king Alfonso XIII. From October 1923, CYB broadcast on Tuesdays, Thursdays and Saturdays from 8-9pm. At the end of 1923, CYB broadcast a bullfight for the first time ever; the next year, it did so live from the El Toreo ring in Condesa, its first remote broadcast.

While the CYB callsign had been used since the station signed on, it was formally awarded to the station the next year at an international convention in Bern, where Mexico received callsigns CYA to CZZ. In Washington in 1929, Mexico moved to the XE callsign range and the station became XEB.

Setting the pace
XEB was notable as a station where many important personalities and genres in Mexican radio got their start. In 1929, actress Pura Córdoba founded a drama group devoted to performing radio plays, which laid down the foundation for the genre's success in Mexico. Jorge Marrón, Julio Sotelo, Enrique W. Curtiss and others all started at XEB, which at this time was located at 665 kHz.

In August 1933, XEB debuted on shortwave as XEBT on 6 MHz; the next year, in October 1934, its medium wave station moved to 1030 kHz. Walter Cross Buchanan was the chief engineer from the mid-1930s, also working at the Instituto Politécnico Nacional where he created the electronic engineering program. He later became the Secretary of Communications and Transport.

Wartime
From 1942 to 1946, XEB broadcast two prominent newscasts, the "Noticiero Mundial" and "El oído del mundo", important as conflict broke out in Europe and Asia. World War II brought with it a competition among radio stations to be first with the latest developments.

On October 12, 1942, XEB inaugurated its new facilities with five studios, two theaters for concerts and a United Press newswire, and also boasted of its creation of a 40-transmitter network to reach all Mexico. The station also jumped to 100 kW of power, but it had trouble maintaining the transmitter as the war effort made finding replacement parts impossible.

In April 1945, XEB was the first station to inform Mexican listeners of the death of Franklin Delano Roosevelt, four minutes before the competition. That same year, it created a sports radio network featuring such personalities as Julio Sotelo, Fernando Marcos and Cristino Lorenzo.

After the war
From 1946 on, XEB's live musical programming was steadily supplanted by recordings, which was more economical, but high-profile stars like Miguel Prado, Blanca Estela Pavón and Raquel Moreno remained on the air.

By 1950, XEB was branded as "La Emisora de las Américas" (The Station of the Americas). On AM, it was already broadcasting at 1220 kHz, its current frequency. On shortwave, XEBT was at 9.625 MHz.

In 1952, XEB was sold to Luis Martínez Vértiz. During this time, sports announcers like Óscar Esquivel and Ángel Fernandez joined the station, which became known as "Voz y expresión de México" the next year. The format consisted of news, romance music and programs for ranchera music.

Sistema Radiópolis
In 1957, Emilio Azcárraga acquired XEB and incorporated it into the Radiópolis network. The next year, XEB moved to be alongside XEQ-AM 940 and XEDF-AM 970. During this era, Alejandro Rodríguez Morán, known as "El Sheriff", devised XEB's longtime slogan "El B grande de México" and its popular nighttime program "Serenata XEB", which debuted in 1960.

In 1962, XEBT was closed, and the Radiópolis stations were branded as the "three points of gold", XEB alongside XEQ and XEDF. This later rose to four, with the integration of XERPM-AM 660, and then to five with XEMP-AM 710 brought into the fold.

Radio Fórmula
Rogerio Azcárraga Madero bought XEB in 1967, forming Grupo ORO. The station moved to another building, and in 1975, the owner became known as Radio Fórmula. The station was branded as Radio 3, as it was the highest of Fórmula's three stations on the dial after XERPM and XEMP-AM 710.

Government ownership and IMER
On December 21, 1978, the ownership of XEB, XERPM and XEMP was taken by the federal government. From then until the formation of the Instituto Mexicano de la Radio in 1983, it was operated by the state-owned concessionaire Compañía Nacional de Radiodifusión, S. A.

References

External links
  XEB La B grande — official site
  Mexico Radio... Station Pictures from the 60's — pictures of XEB and other Mexico City stations in 1963 by a former intern at Organización Radio Centro
 FCC information on XEB

Radio stations established in 1923
Radio stations in Mexico City
Clear-channel radio stations